Cartoon Network is a German pay television channel which primarily broadcasts cartoons. It is based in Munich and is available in Germany, Austria, and Switzerland.

Broadcasting
In August 2013, SES Platform Services (later MX1, now part of SES Video) won an international tender by Turner Broadcasting System to provide playout services for Cartoon Network, Boomerang, glitz*, TNT Film and TNT Serie (in both SD and HD) for the German-speaking market, digitization of existing Turner content, and playout for Turner on-demand and catch-up services in Germany, Austria, Switzerland and the Benelux region, from November 2013.

M7 Group's Kabelkiosk stopped broadcasting of Cartoon Network on 1 March 2017.

History
Cartoon Network launched in Germany on September 3, 2005 as a Saturday morning programming block on kabel eins. In December 2013 kabel eins cancelled the programming block. In June 2006, a German version of Boomerang was launched; this was followed by the simultaneous launch of Cartoon Network Germany as a 24-hour channel and TCM Germany on December 5, 2006. On 1 September 2016, Cartoon Network Germany re-branded using graphics from the Check It 4.0 branding package.

Logos

Programming

Current 
 Adventure Time
 Batwheels
 Be Cool, Scooby-Doo!
 Ben 10 (2016 TV series)
 Craig of the Creek
 DC Super Friends
 Jade Armor
 Lego Monkie Kid
 Looney Tunes Cartoons
 New Looney Tunes
 Scooby-Doo and Guess Who?
 Teen Titans Go!
 The Amazing World of Gumball
 The Heroic Quest of the Valiant Prince Ivandoe
 Total DramaRama
 We Baby Bears
 We Bare Bears

References

External links
 Official Site
 Austrian Official Site (Redirects to German)
 Swiss Official Site
 Press office

Children's television networks
Cartoon Network
Television stations in Germany
Television stations in Austria
Television stations in Switzerland
German-language television stations
Television channels and stations established in 2006
Turner Broadcasting System Germany
2006 establishments in Germany
2006 establishments in Austria
Warner Bros. Discovery EMEA